Coris may refer to:

 Coris (fish), a fish genus in the family Labridae
 Coris (plant), a plant genus in the family Primulaceae
 Coris District, a district of the Ancash Region in Peru
 San Pedro de Coris District, a district of the Huancavelica Region in Peru

See also
 Cori (disambiguation)
 Corris

Genus disambiguation pages